Pineios is a municipality in the Elis regional unit, West Greece region, Greece. The seat of the municipality is the town Gastouni. The municipality has an area of 161.496 km2. It was named after the river Pineios.

Municipality
The municipality Pineios was formed at the 2011 local government reform by the merger of the following 3 former municipalities, that became municipal units:
Gastouni
Tragano
Vartholomio

References

Municipalities of Western Greece
Populated places in Elis